Rolland is a surname and masculine given name which may refer to:

Surname
 Alain Rolland (born 1966), former Irish rugby union footballer and current international referee
 Andy Rolland (born 1943), Scottish former footballer
 Antonin Rolland (born 1928), French retired cyclist
 Colette Rolland (born 1943), French computer scientist and academic
 Douglas Rolland (1861-1914), Scottish golfer in the late 19th century
 George Rolland (1869-1910), British recipient of the Victoria Cross
 Georges Rolland (1852–1910), French geologist, explorer and industrialist
 Gustave Rolland (1809–1871), French engineer and politician
 James Rolland (1802-1889), New Zealand politician
 Jean-Baptiste Rolland (1815–1888), Canadian printer, bookseller, businessman and politician
 Jean-Christophe Rolland (born 1968), French rower and 2000 Olympic champion in the coxless pairs
 Kayla Rolland (1993-2000), child shot and killed by another child 
 Kevin Rolland (born 1989), French freestyle skier
 Léon Louis Rolland (1841-1912), French mycologist
 Madeleine Rolland (1872-1960), French translator and peace activist
 Matthias Rolland (born 1979), French rugby union player
 Marion Rolland (born 1982), French retired World Cup alpine ski racer
 Michel Rolland (born 1947), French oenologist
 Monique Rolland (1913–1999), French film actress
 Pierre Rolland (disambiguation), several people
 Romain Rolland (1866-1944), French writer, novelist, essayist, art historian and mystic
 Roy Rolland (1921-1997), comedian and stage actor who played Old Mother Riley
 Stéphane Rolland, French fashion designer
 Vincent Rolland (born 1970), French politician

Given name
 Roland Burris (born 1937), American politician and attorney
 Rolland Busch (1920-1985), Australian theologian and Presbyterian and Uniting Church minister
 Rolland Courbis (born 1953), French football manager and former player
 Rolland Fisher (1900-1982), American minister and evangelist who actively promoted the temperance movement
 Rollie Greeno (1926-2010), American college football coach
 Rolland Lawrence (born 1951), American retired National Football League player
 Rolland O'Regan (1904–1992), New Zealand surgeon, activist and politician
 Rolland W. Redlin (1920-2011), American politician
 Rollie Seltz (born 1924), American retired basketball player who played in the National Basketball Association's first season
 Rolland H. Spaulding (1873-1942), American manufacturer, politician and Governor of New Hampshire
 Rollie Stiles (1906-2007), American Major League Baseball pitcher
 Rolland Todd, basketball player and first coach of the Portland Trail Blazers team in the National Basketball Association
 Rollie Williams (1897-1968), American National Football League player in 1923 and college basketball and football coach

See also
 Roland (disambiguation)
 Kelly Rowland, American singer, actress and TV personality
 Rollie, a list of people with the nickname

Given names
Surnames
Masculine given names
French-language surnames
Surnames of French origin
English-language surnames
Surnames of British Isles origin